Line 1 of the Guiyang Metro, is a subway line in Guiyang.

The northern section (Guanshanhu section) opened on December 28, 2017. The southern section was opened on December 1, 2018. Douguan station opened on December 28, 2019.

Opening timeline

Stations

Notes

References

01
2017 establishments in China
Railway lines opened in 2017